Peripsocus phaeopterus is a species of Psocoptera from the Peripsocidae family that can be found in Great Britain and Ireland. The species are black coloured.

Habitat 
The species feed on Alnus incana, beech, birch, broom, elm, hawthorn, hazel, hornbeam, larch, oak, pine, sea buckthorn, and yew. It also likes to feed on lime.

References 

Peripsocidae
Insects described in 1836
Psocoptera of Europe